The following is a list of works by American author Stephen Crane.

Novels
—. Maggie: A Girl of the Streets. New York: [printer unknown], 1893.
—. The Red Badge of Courage. New York: D. Appleton & Company, 1895.
—. George's Mother. New York: Edward Arnold, 1896.
—. The Third Violet. New York: D. Appleton and Company, 1897.
—. Active Service. New York: Frederick A. Stokes Company, 1899.
Crane, Stephen and Robert Barr. The O'Ruddy. New York: Frederick A. Stokes Company, 1903.

Short story collections
—. The Little Regiment and Other Episodes from the American Civil War. New York: Appleton, 1896.
—. The Open Boat and Other Tales of Adventure. New York: Doubleday & McClure, 1898.
—. The Monster and Other Stories. New York: Harper & Brothers Publishers, 1899. (Contains only The Monster, "The Blue Hotel", and "His New Mittens".)
—. Whilomville Stories. New York and London: Harper, 1900.
—. Wounds in the Rain: War Stories. New York: Frederick A. Stokes Company, 1900.
—. Great Battles of the World. Philadelphia: Lippincott, 1901.
—. The Monster. London: Harper, 1901. (Contains The Monster, "The Blue Hotel", "His New Mittens", "Twelve O'Clock", "Moonlight on the Snow", "Manacled", and "An Illusion in Red and White".)
—. Last Words. London, 1902.

Poetry collections
—. The Black Riders and Other Lines. Boston: Copeland and Day, 1895.
—. War is Kind and Other Lines. New York: Frederick A. Stokes Company, 1899.

Unfinished works
Sources report that following an encounter with a male prostitute in the spring of 1894, Crane began a novel on the subject entitled Flowers of Asphalt. He reportedly abandoned the project and the manuscript has never been recovered.

Notes

References
Stallman, R. W. (1972). Stephen Crane: A Critical Bibliography. Iowa State University. .
Wertheim, Stanley (1997). A Stephen Crane Encyclopedia. Greenwood Publishing Group. .
Williams, Ames William (1970). Stephen Crane: A Bibliography. New York: Ayer Publishing. .

External links

Works by Stephen Crane at Internet Archive
 

Bibliographies by writer
Bibliographies of American writers
Poetry bibliographies